Andrea Barberi (born 15 January 1979) is an Italian sprint athlete who specializes in the 400 metres.

Biography
He finished fifth at the 2006 European Athletics Championships and at the 2007 European Athletics Indoor Championships. He also reached the semi-finals of the 2005 World Athletics Championships. At the 2006 IAAF World Cup he finished fifth in 4 x 400 metres relay with the European team.

On 27 August 2006 in Rieti he ran in 45.19 seconds, breaking the Italian outdoor record which had stood since 1981.

National titles
Andrea Barberi has won 9 times the individual national championship.
8 wins in 400 metres (2001, 2002, 2003, 2004, 2005, 2006, 2007, 2008)
1 win in 400 metres indoor (2004)

See also
 Italian all-time lists - 400 metres
 Italy national relay team

References

External links
 

1979 births
Living people
People from Tivoli, Lazio
Italian male sprinters
World Athletics Championships athletes for Italy
Italian Athletics Championships winners
Sportspeople from the Metropolitan City of Rome Capital